The Deputy Speaker of the Parliament of Lebanon is the second highest-ranking official of the Lebanese Parliament.

National Pact
Though the constitution does not require it, an unwritten understanding between the Maronite, Sunni, Shia, Greek Orthodox and Druze leaderships in Lebanon in 1943, known as the National Pact, has resulted in the holder of the post being a Greek Orthodox Christian in every electoral cycle since that time.

Former Deputy Speakers
 Michel Georges Sassine
 Adib Ferzli
 Mounir Abou Fadel
 Farid Makari
 Albert Moukheiber
 Elie Ferzli

See also
 List of presidents of Lebanon
 List of prime ministers of Lebanon
 List of speakers of the Parliament of Lebanon

References

Legislative speakers of Lebanon
Legislative deputy speakers